Gerard Tubier (born 26 October 1938) is an Australian fencer. He competed in the team foil event at the 1964 Summer Olympics.

References

1938 births
Living people
Australian male fencers
Olympic fencers of Australia
Fencers at the 1964 Summer Olympics